Finland competed at the 2008 Summer Paralympics in Beijing. Athletes were selected by the Finnish Paralympic Committee on July 2, 2008.

Medalists

Sports

Archery

|-
|align=left|Keijo Kallunki
|align=left|Men's individual compound
|675
|11
|Bye
|L 110-115
|colspan=4|did not advance
|-
|align=left|Jean-Pierre Antonios
|rowspan=2 align=left|Men's individual compound standing
|606
|8
|
|L 89-94
|colspan=4|did not advance
|-
|align=left|Osmo Kinnunen
|627
|4
|
|Bye
|W 111-97
|L 97-99
|L 101-111
|4
|}

Athletics

Men's track

Men's field

Women's field

Boccia

Cycling

Men's road

Equestrian

Goalball

The men's team didn't win any medals; they were 7th out of 12 teams.

Players
 Veli-Matti Aittola
 Toni Alenius
 Jorma Kivinen
 Jarno Mattila
 Erkki Miinala
 Petri Posio

Tournament

Quarterfinals

5-8th classification

7/8th classification

Judo

Powerlifting

Sailing

Finland received one national entry to the 2008 Summer Paralympics sailing events:

Men
 Juhani Mattila (Single-Person Keelboat - 2.4mR)

Shooting

Men

Women

Swimming

Table tennis

Wheelchair tennis

See also
2008 Summer Paralympics
Finland at the Paralympics
Finland at the 2008 Summer Olympics

References

External links
International Paralympic Committee

Nations at the 2008 Summer Paralympics
2008
Paralympics